The 1981 NAIA Men's Ice Hockey Tournament involved eight schools playing in single-elimination bracket to determine the national champion of men's NAIA college ice hockey. The 1981 tournament was the 15th men's ice hockey tournament to be sponsored by the NAIA.   The tournament began on March 5, 1981 and ended with the championship game on March 7, 1981.

Ed Saugestad was named NAIA National Coach of the Year in 1982.

Bracket

1982 Tournament
Wessman Arena, Superior, Wisconsin

Note: * denotes overtime period(s)

References

External links 
 NAIA ice hockey

Ice
NAIA Men's Ice Hockey Championship
NAIA Ice Hockey Championship 
NAIA Ice Hockey Championship